MINDBODY, Inc. is a San Luis Obispo, California-based software-as-a-service company that provides cloud-based online scheduling and other business management software for the wellness services industry. Founded in 2001, the company services over 58,000 health and wellness businesses with about 35 million consumers in over 130 countries and territories. Since  October 2021, the company has owned ClassPass. It is majority owned by Vista Equity Partners, a private equity firm.

The Mindbody mobile app is integrated with Fitbit and Under Armour’s MyFitnessPal.

History
Mindbody was originally known as HardBody SoftWare. It began as a Sole Proprietorship in 1998 by Blake Beltram, and evolved into an LLC with Co-founder Rick Stollmeyer on February 13, 2001. Beltram exited and was effectively replaced as a major partner by Bob Murphy in 2003, who was then given the title Co-founder. The company later incorporated as MINDBODY, Inc. In 2005, Mindbody Online was launched.

Financing
The company received its first financing round of US$1 million in November 2005 from Tech Coast Angels and Pasadena Angels.

In April 2009, it received $5.6 million in financing from Catalyst Investors.

In August 2010, it raised $11 million from Bessemer Venture Partners and Catalyst Investors.

It received another round of funding in November 2012 of US$35 million from Bessemer Venture Partners, Institutional Venture Partners, and Catalyst Investors.

In February 2014, Mindbody received its final round of private funding in the amount of US$50 million from Bessemer Venture Partners, Institutional Venture Partners, Catalyst Investors, W Capital Partners and Montreux Equity Partners.

In June 2015, the company became a public company via an initial public offering, raising $100 million.

In February 2019, the company was acquired by Vista Equity Partners for US$1.9 billion.

In 2019 Mindbody was acquired by Vista Equity Partners and promised to not leave the central coast of California both to the media and staff.  Yet, after a two layoffs, the first being in March of 2020 and the second on November 1, 2022 the majority of the company is no longer located in the region of San Luis Obispo CA. 

Mindbody has had three CEOs since Vista’s acquisition; Rick Stollmeyer, Josh McCarter, and Fritz Lanman.  Rick Stollmeyer was the co-founding/original CEO of Mindbody. Josh McCarter was the co-Founder and former CEO of Booker which was acquired by Mindbody and took over as CEO of Mindbody when Rick Stollmeyer stepped down from leadership. On October 13, 2021, Mindbody + Vista acquired a former competitor, ClassPass, whose CEO, Fritz Lanman, came onboard as President of Mindbody. Less than a year later, Josh McCarter resigned and Fritz Lanman became the new CEO on September 3, 2022.  On November 1, 2022, just two months after becoming CEO, Fritz Lanman laid off 300-400 Mindbody as well as ClassPass staff.

Acquisitions
In February 2010, Mindbody acquired ClientMagic, a company that provided scheduling and business management software to salons and spas.

In June 2013, Mindbody acquired Jill's List, a platform for Integrative Healthcare practitioners.

In February 2015, Mindbody acquired Fitness Mobile Apps. At the time of the acquisition the company was creating customizable applications for iOS and Android platforms.

In September 2016, Mindbody acquired HealCode, a technology company that designed web tools for the fitness and wellness industry.

In March 2017, the company acquired Lymber Wellness.

In February 2018, the company acquired FitMetrix. In October 2018, the company exposed millions of user records due to its servers not having passwords.

In March 2018, the company acquired Booker Software for $150 million.

In May 2019, the company acquired Bowtie.ai.

In May 2019, the company acquired Simplicity First.

In May 2020, the company acquired ZeeZor, an analytics and staff engagement platform for salon and spa businesses.

In October 2021, the company acquired ClassPass.

Awards and recognition
 2016 Webby Award and Webby People's Voice Award in the Mobile App: Fitness and Recreation category.
 Mindbody Connect—Codie Award for Best Consumer Mobile Application 2015.
 Mindbody Express—Silicon Valley Business Awards, App: Best Finance & Management App 2015.
 Named among the top 50 best places to work by Glassdoor in 2016, 2015 and 2014. 
 Named among Inc. magazine’s fastest growing companies in the US from 2008–2015, and making the Inc. 500 list in 2009.
 Ranked 8th on the list of Top 10 Most Innovative Companies in Beauty by Fast Company.

References

2001 establishments in the United States
2015 initial public offerings
2019 mergers and acquisitions
Business software
Companies formerly listed on the Nasdaq
Cloud applications
Cloud computing providers
Privately held companies of the United States
Software companies based in California
Software companies established in 2001
Software companies of the United States